The Gusa Regional Science High School - X ( colloquially RegSci, GSci or RS, is the Regional Science High School for Region X - Northern Mindanao. It is a specialized public science high school supervised by the Department of Education located in Gusa, Cagayan de Oro, Philippines. It is the premier science high school of Northern Mindanao, and one of the two science high schools in the region, together with the Philippine Science High School Central Mindanao Campus. The school was established in 1994 as Gusa National High School - RSHS Annex. It became the Regional Science High School for Northern Mindanao in 2002 through the House Bill No. 3000 of the 15th Congress. From the name Gusa National High School-Regional Science High School Annex, it was then changed into Gusa Regional Science High School - X, through the RA 10267.

History
The Gusa Barangay High School is the center or the barangay high school for barangay Gusa, Cagayan de Oro. In 1994, through the efforts of the Gusa Barangay Council and other supporting authorities, it was then renamed to Gusa National High School. In the late 1990s, through the efforts of the principal Mrs. Myrna L. Mandawe, from Gusa National High School, it then became the Regional Science High School (Gusa National High School) for Region X. On October 3, 2002, Gusa National High School (Regional Science High School Annex) was identified as the Regional Science High School for Region X, respectively, pursuant to Dep. Ed order no. 48 s. 2002. In 2012, through the House Bill No. 3000 of the 15th Congress of the Philippines, it was then renamed as Gusa Regional Science High School-X. The principal Mrs. Mandawe had her retirement in November 2013, and was then replaced by Mr. Marlon Francis C. Seriña. Seriña had his service from November 2013 to July 2015, and was replaced by Mrs. Evelyn Q. Sumanda. Sumanda had her service done of 2018 and was replace by Mrs. Brenda P. Galarpe.

Top Performing High School in Cagayan de Oro
GRSHS-X is the leading secondary institution both in private and public schools in Cagayan de Oro. Based on the annual National Achievement Test results, the school is consistent for being on top among all high school institutions in the city.

Admission

Junior high school

Students who belong to upper 10% of the Grade 6 graduating class, recommended by their respective principals are qualified to take the entrance exam.

To acquire an entrance examination form, examinees should have:
 A final grade of 85% in English, Science and Mathematics
 A final grade of 83% in all other learning areas, and
 A weighted average of at least 85%.

Students should maintain a grade of 85 for major subjects and 83 in minor subjects. Students failing to meet this requirement would be put under probation for the following year. Students still failing to meet the requirements will be due to disqualification, required to transfer to another school by the end of the school year.

Senior High School

Grade 10 or Junior High School completers that will take up the Science and Technology, Engineering, and Mathematics (STEM) strand in Senior High School shall take up the pre-registration and Senior High School Admission Test (SHSAT).

Requirements for Senior High admission are as follows:
 Senior High School Admission Test (SHSAT) results
 Certificate of Junior High School or Grade 10 completion
 National Career Assessment Examination (NCAE) results
 A final grade of at least 85% in all subject areas, and
 A weighted average of at at least 85%.

Academics

Gusa Regional Science High School-X is the center of academic excellence in Region X, Northern Mindanao. It is operated and supervised by the Department of Education, with a curriculum heavily focusing on math and science. It remains within the ambit of the Department of Education, unlike the specialized science high school system of national scope, the Philippine Science High School. It is the premier science high school founded in the whole region that is under the supervision of the Department of Education. It is a member of the Regional Science High School Union, a specialized system of public secondary schools in the Philippines, established during the 1994–1995 school year, which consists of a network of 17 schools in the country which offer a science-oriented curriculum that caters to students with aptitude in the sciences.

The school is aimed at the development of a science culture among the students with the view to preparing them for careers in the sciences.

A research paper is a requirement for graduation or for completion in Junior High School.

Media of communication
Gusa Regional Science High School uses the universal language, English, as a prerequisite on communication. English is used by the school personnel and the students inside the campus premises, excluding on their Filipino and Spanish time. The Filipino Language is also used, as an enhancement in learning more about the national language. The school has an elective Spanish subject, for the Grades 9 and 10.

Curriculum
The school is following the new curriculum by the Department of Education, the Enhanced K to 12 Curriculum, as of the school year 2012-2013 and Curricula of English, Science and Mathematics is enriched by additional subjects and electives prescribed in DepEd Order no. 49, s. 2003.

Class description
A number of six classes for each year level. Minimum of thirty (30) and a maximum of forty (40) students per class for better instruction and improved laboratory work. Managed by School Principal in coordination with DepEd Regional and Division Offices.

Grading system
Four (4) grading periods Numerical and Letter-grade system of grading and in multiples of one Final grade of 85% in English, Science and Mathematics and a final grade of 83% in all other learning areas, without grades lower than 80% in all subjects.

Extracurricular

The following are the list of the clubs in the school, however, the following list may be incomplete.

The Supreme Student Government
The Supreme Student Government (SSG) is the foremost co-curricular organization and the highest student representation that is mandated to organize pertinent programs in the interest of the studentry.

Under the 2014-2015 SSG administration (Yap, J.S., Mutiangpili, R.F., Santos, C.M., et al.), sub-committees were created. These include the creation of the Central Information System (CIS), a centralized system in information dissemination that ensures reliability and fast track sharing of threads. Also established the Council of Class Presidents (COCP) for the vision that decision making procedure is not just for the SSG officers alone but also for the class presidents and even for the commoners as well through break out sessions and year level group participation. The Committee on Transparency (COT) that guards the collection and secures the auditing procedure was also created. The Desk on Rights and Welfare (DRAW) that defends the helpless and invite volunteers advocating for peace was also introduced. Adding lastly is the launching of Convergence of Clubs and Departments (ConCluDe). Each committees were assigned to the SSG officers depending on their position.

Campus Journalism

Gusa Regional Science High School - X is recently known as the journalism hub of the Division of Cagayan de Oro for having numerous achievements in campus journalism contests. Since then, the school sends participants in the Regional and National Campus Journalism Competitions.

This year (2016), the institution recently won as the Overall Champion in the 2016 Cagayan de Oro Division Schools Press Conference, garnering its sixth (6th) consecutive overall championship (since 2011) in the said journalism event.

In 2016, 7 campus journalists from Gusa Regional Science High School - X won 3rd place in Collaborative Desktop Publishing - Filipino in the 2016 National Schools Press Conference held in Koronadal City, South Cotabato on February 22–26, 2016 (the school's most recent win in the NSPC). The school also sent 40 campus journalists to the recent Regional Schools Press Conference in Malaybalay City, Bukidnon where 22 of them proceeds to the 2017 National Schools Press Conference in Pagadian City, Zamboanga del Sur.

Official student publications

Nudo Veritas is the official English student publication of Gusa Regional Science High School - X with the motto "The Power to Write is the Power to Achieve". The publication is awarded as the Best School Paper in the Division of Cagayan de Oro and in Region X over the past years, until now. Recently the publication was recently awarded as the Best School Paper in the 2016 Regional Schools Press Conference in Malaybalay City, Bukidnon.

Ang Sinagtala, the counterpart of Nudo Veritas, is the official Filipino student publication of Gusa Regional Science High School - X with the motto "Ang Bakas ng Karanasan, Ang Tanda ng Kaalaman". The publication is also an award-winning paper and recently garnered awards having the best pages. It was also recently awarded as the Best School Paper in the 2015 Division Schools Press Conference in the Division of Cagayan de Oro, and the Best School Paper in the 2015 Regional Schools Press Conference in Region X - Northern Mindanao.

International participation

Facilities

References

Regional Science High School Union
Science high schools in the Philippines
Schools in Cagayan de Oro